The mayor of Taguig is the head of the local government of the city of Taguig who is elected to three year terms. The mayor is also the executive head and leads the city's departments in executing the city ordinances and improving public services. The city mayor is restricted to three consecutive terms, totaling nine years, although a mayor can be elected again after an interruption of one term. Lani Cayetano of Nacionalista Party is the incumbent since 2022.

From the start, Taguig has its own chieftain, Lakan named Juan Basi who fought his life against the Spaniard along with Agustin de Legaspi, a nephew of Lakan Dula and son-in-law of the Sultan of Brunei during the Magat Salamat uprising in 1587–1588. But since the year 1584, a non-resident vicar from the Augustinian order named P. Melchor de Ribera was assigned to convert to Christianity the natives of the town.

In 1587 according to P. Gaspar San Agustin, Taguig was once again accepted in the list of "Augustinian Chapter" in a meeting held on April 4, 1587 through "Tomamos de nuevo la casa de Tagui, con voto".

Encomienda de Tagui is under the administration of Capitan Vergara since 1587 with 3,200 population who pays tribute tax amounting to 1,879 & 1/2. The original Nine (9) villages of Taguig are Bagumbayan, Hagonoy, Uaua (Wawa), Bambang, Toctocan (Tuktukan), Ususan (Maysapang), Sta. Ana (Poblacion), Palingong, and Tipas.

List

Mayor of Taguig

Mayor of Taguig City

List of acting and appointed OIC mayors of Taguig

Pictures of some past Mayors of Taguig

Notes

References

Taguig
Taguig
Politics of Taguig